The  Atlanta Falcons season was the franchise's 46th season in the National Football League and the fourth under head coach Mike Smith.

Finishing the regular season 10–6, the Falcons clinched the #5 seed in the playoffs.  Atlanta's season ended quickly as they lost 24–2 to the eventual Super Bowl XLVI champion New York Giants in the opening round.

This is also the first time the franchise clinched consecutive playoff berths, and the first time it won ten or more games in consecutive seasons.

Offseason

Signings

Departures

2011 NFL Draft

 The Falcons acquired this seventh-round selection and a 2010 sixth-round selection in a trade that sent CB Chris Houston to the Detroit Lions.
 The Falcons acquired this seventh-round selection in a trade that sent T Quinn Ojinnaka to the New England Patriots.

Preseason

Schedule
The Falcons' preseason schedule was announced on April 12, 2011.

Regular season

Schedule

Game summaries

Week 1: at Chicago Bears

The Falcons started their season out on the road against the Bears.  With the loss, the team fell to 0–1.

Week 2: vs. Philadelphia Eagles

For the regular season opener at home, the Falcons faced the Eagles.  The win improved the team to 1–1 and also helped Starting QB Matt Ryan improve to 4–0 as a regular season starter during home openers.

Week 3: at Tampa Bay Buccaneers

With the loss, the Falcons fell to 1–2.

Week 4: at Seattle Seahawks

With the win, the Falcons improved to 2–2.

Week 5: vs. Green Bay Packers

The Falcons went home for a week 5 duel with the undefeated Packers.  This would be a rematch of last year's NFC Divisional Round.  With the loss, the Falcons fell to 2–3.

Week 6: vs. Carolina Panthers

With their 3rd-straight win over the Panthers, the Falcons improved to 3–3.

Week 7: at Detroit Lions

With the win, the Falcons went into their bye week at 4–3.

Week 9: at Indianapolis Colts

With the win, the Falcons improved to 5–3 and went 2–13 overall against the Colts.

Week 10: vs. New Orleans Saints

With the loss, the Falcons fell to 5–4.

Week 11: vs. Tennessee Titans

With the win, the Falcons improved to 6–4.

Week 12: vs. Minnesota Vikings

With the win, the Falcons improved to 7–4.

Week 13: at Houston Texans

With the loss, the Falcons fell to 7–5.

Week 14: at Carolina Panthers

With the win, the Falcons improved to 8–5.

Week 15: vs. Jacksonville Jaguars

With the win, the Falcons improved to 9–5.

Week 16: at New Orleans Saints

With the loss, the Falcons fell to 9–6, but were able to clinch a playoff spot due to the Chicago Bears 35–21 loss to the Green Bay Packers Sunday night.

Week 17: vs. Tampa Bay Buccaneers

With the win, the Falcons finished the season at 10–6 and captured the NFC's #5 seed.

Standings

Postseason

Schedule

Game summaries

NFC Wild Card Playoff Game: at #4 New York Giants

The Falcons lost their Wild Card round playoff game to the New York Giants on January 8, 2012, by a score of 24–2. It is the first time in NFL playoff history that a team has scored exactly two points. The previous NFL team to score only a safety in a game was the 1993 Cincinnati Bengals in Week 15 against the New England Patriots.

Staff

Final roster

References

Atlanta
Atlanta Falcons seasons
2011 in sports in Georgia (U.S. state)